Icche Gaon or Echey Gaon is a village in the Kalimpong II CD block in the Kalimpong Sadar subdivision of the Kalimpong district of the state of West Bengal, India.

Geography

Location

Icche Gaon, situated at 5800 ft above mean sea level, has a view of Mount Kangchenjunga and nearby peaks. Icche Gaon is located 89 km from New Jalpaiguri.

Area overview
The map alongside shows the Kalimpong Sadar subdivision of Kalimpong district. This region is characterized by abruptly rising hills and numerous small streams. It is a predominantly rural area with 77.67% of the population living in rural areas and only 22.23% living in the urban areas. While Kalimpong is the only municipality, Dungra is the sole census town in the entire area. The economy is agro-based and there are 6 tea gardens in the Gorubathan CD block. In 2011, Kalimpong subdivision had a literacy rate of 81.85%, comparable with the highest levels of literacy in the districts of the state. While the first degree college in the subdivision was established at Kalimpong in 1962 the entire subdivision (and now the entire district), other than the head-quarters, had to wait till as late as 2015 (more than half a century) to have their first degree colleges at Pedong and Gorubathan.

Note: The map alongside presents some of the notable locations in the subdivision. All places marked in the map are linked in the larger full screen map.

Avi Flora and Fauna
In October this hilly region is flooded with different colors like white, orange, maroon and golden yellow Marigolds. Different types of ferns including tree fern and countless types of flowerless plants, mosses, algae, fungi, birches, orchids and among trees; oaks, pines, chestnuts, maples are seen here. 
Ichche Gaon is the home of  varieties of beautiful birds like flycatchers, orioles, finches, sunbirds,  woodpeckers, rufous sibia, emerald cuckoos, three-toed kingfisher and blue whistling thrush

Tourism
Ichche Gaon is surrounded by many trekking courses. Those trekking courses leads towards the absolute most pictorial view points of Ichche Gaon like Ramitey Dara, Tinchule and Jalsa. Ramitey Dara offers the all encompassing perspective on river Teesta making the unbelievable 14 turns through the rugged Himalayan valley. On a clear day tourists can get perspective on Mt. Kanchenjunga alongside the towns of Sikkim, Jelep La and Nathula from Tinchuley. Damsang fortress, the last home of the Lepcha King-GyaboAchuk, situated at a distance of 6 km from Icche Gaon is additionally a fascination in the sightseers. Another fascination here is the Sangchen Dorjee Monastery worked around 300 years back, this Monastery gives an understanding into the history and culture of Pedong and the surroundings. Another well known perspective here is Rikisum. 15 km from Pedong Bazaar, are the Reshi Bridge and Reshi Khola, are additionally worth visiting. Rishi and Mudum Khola combine to frame Rishi Khola just before the scaffold, and has an enchanting sentimental vibe, along these lines being a well known decision for the travelers.

References

Villages in Kalimpong district